The Aeronca Model 50 Chief was an American light plane of the late 1930s. Consumer demand for more comfort, longer range and better instrumentation resulted in its development in 1938, powered by a 50-horsepower (37-kilowatt) Continental, Franklin or Lycoming engine. A 65-horsepower (48-kilowatt) Continental engine powered the Model 65 Super Chief, which was also built in a flight trainer version, the Model TC-65 Defender, with its rear seat positioned nine inches (23 centimeters) higher than the front for better visibility.

Variants
Aeronca 50C Chief
(1938) An improved KCA with a wider cabin, powered by a  Continental A-50. 248 built. The first light-plane to fly non-stop from Los Angeles to New York City, on 29–30 November 1938, covering miles in 30hours 47minutes, averaging , with an impressive fuel cost-per-mile of about one cent.
Aeronca 50F Chief
(1938) powered by a  Franklin 4AC. 40 built.
Aeronca 50L Chief
(1938) The 50L had exposed cylinders and was powered by a  Lycoming O-145. 65 built.
Aeronca 50LA Chief
The 50LA, with Lycoming engine, had a closed cowling. 20 built.
Aeronca 50M Chief
(1938) A single 50M was built, powered by a  Menasco M-50.
Aeronca 50TC
(1939)  The first tandem Aeronca, introduced as competition for the Piper Cub, powered by a  Continental A-50. 16 built.
Aeronca 50TL Tandem
The 50TL was powered by a  Lycoming O-145. 33 built.
Aeronca 60TF
(1940) Essentially the same as the50TC, powered by a  Franklin 4AC conferring slightly increased performance.
Aeronca 60TL Tandem
 Powered by a  Lycoming O-145. 118 built for the USAAF as the O-58B, powered by a  Continental A-65.

Aeronca 65C Chief
(1938) Powered by a  Continental A-65. 279 were built, many of which were impressed by the USAAF as O-58/L-3s in 1942.

Aeronca 65CA Super Chief
The 65C with an optional  auxiliary fuel tank, and other deluxe appointments. 655 built.
Aeronca 65LA Chief
(1939) Powered by a  Lycoming O-145. 87 built.
Aeronca 65LB Super Chief
(1940) Powered by a  Lycoming O-145. 199 built.
Aeronca 65TC Tandem
(1940) Powered by a  Continental A-65.  112 built.
Aeronca 65TAC Defender
Tandem seating for military training, 154 built.
Aeronca 65TF Tandem
1940) Powered by a  Franklin 4AC, 59 built.
Aeronca 65TAF Defender
115 built.
Aeronca 65TL Tandem
(1940) Powered by a  Lycoming O-145. 299 built plus 4 YO-58, 20 O-58, 701 L-3B, and 499 L-3C, plus 253 TG-5 gliders to the USAAF.
Aeronca 65TAL Defender
100 built.

Specifications (Model 50-C Chief)

See also
Aeronca Chief family

References

 

1930s United States civil utility aircraft
Aeronca aircraft
Single-engined tractor aircraft
High-wing aircraft
Aircraft first flown in 1938